is a former Japanese football player.

Playing career
Ishii was born in Hyogo Prefecture on March 29, 1970. After graduating from Meiji University, he joined Gamba Osaka in 1992. He played many matches as side back from 1993. However, eh did not play as often 1995 and he did not play at all in 1996. In 1997, he moved to the Japan Football League club Denso. He retired at the end of the 1998 season.

Club statistics

References

External links

1970 births
Living people
Meiji University alumni
Association football people from Hyōgo Prefecture
Japanese footballers
J1 League players
Japan Football League (1992–1998) players
Gamba Osaka players
FC Kariya players
Association football defenders